Serena Williams and Venus Williams were the defending champions, but both withdrew from the tournament with a pulmonary embolism and a hip injury, respectively.

Andrea Hlaváčková and Lucie Hradecká won the title, defeating Sania Mirza and Elena Vesnina in the final 6–4, 6–3.

Seeds

Draw

Finals

Top half

Section 1

Section 2

Bottom half

Section 3

Section 4

References
 Main draw
2011 French Open – Women's draws and results at the International Tennis Federation

Women's Doubles
French Open - Women's Doubles
French Open by year – Women's doubles
2011 in women's tennis
2011 in French women's sport